Poliodes is a genus of moths in the family Sphingidae, containing one species, Poliodes roseicornis, which is known from dry bush in Ethiopia, Somalia and Kenya.

References

Smerinthini
Taxa named by Walter Rothschild
Moths of Africa
Monotypic moth genera
Taxa named by Karl Jordan